{{Infobox song
| name       = Price of Love
| cover      =
| alt        =
| type       = single
| artist     = Bad English
| album      = Bad English
| B-side     = The Restless Ones
| released   = 1990<ref>{{cite web|url=http://www.spirit-of-metal.com/album-groupe-Bad_English-nom_album-Price_of_Love-l-en.html|title=Bad English- Price of Love (7)- Spirit of Metal Webzine (en)|publisher=|accessdate=10 January 2015}}</ref>
| format     =
| recorded   = 1989
| studio     =
| venue      =
| genre      = Glam metal
| length     = 4:48
| label      = Epic
| writer     = Jonathan Cain, John Waite
| producer   = Richie Zito
| prev_title =
| prev_year  =
| next_title =
| next_year  =
}}

"Price of Love" is a song by American/British band Bad English, released as the third single from their 1989 self-titled debut album of the same name. The power ballad reached number five on the U.S. Billboard Hot 100 in March 1990. It also charted in the top 40 of the Billboard'' Adult Contemporary and Mainstream Rock charts. In Australia, the song reached No. 44.

Music video
The music video for the song featured alternating scenes of lead singer John Waite standing with various moving cityscapes in the background and scenes of the band performing on a stage.

Charts

Year-end charts

References

1989 songs
1990 singles
Bad English songs
Songs written by Jonathan Cain
Songs written by John Waite
Epic Records singles
Song recordings produced by Richie Zito
Glam metal ballads
1980s ballads